This is a list of all tornadoes that were confirmed throughout Europe by the European Severe Storms Laboratory and local meteorological agencies during 2022. Unlike the United States, the original Fujita Scale and the TORRO scale are used to rank tornadoes across the continent.

European yearly total 

So far, there have been 214 confirmed tornadic events reported in Europe in 2022
Countries not listed in this table have no reported tornadoes thus far in 2022.

January

January 7

January 8

January 24

January 25

January 29

February

February 6

February 7

February 17

March

April

May

May 2

May 3

May 4

May 12

May 17

May 19

May 20 (Central Europe tornado outbreak)

May 24

May 26

May 27

June

June 1

June 5

June 7

June 9

June 10

June 12

June 13

June 14

June 15

June 16

June 20

June 21

June 22

See also
 Tornadoes of 2022
 Weather of 2022
 List of European tornadoes in 2012
 List of tornadoes rated on the International Fujita scale

References

Tornadoes of 2022
 2022
Tornado-related lists
Tornadoes
2022-related lists
2022 meteorology